Harpullia frutescens  is a shrub found in rainforests of eastern Australia. It was first described by Frederick Manson Bailey in 1889.

Distribution and habitat 
It grows in rainforests in Queensland from Port Douglas to Cardwell.

References 

 

frutescens
Sapindales of Australia
Flora of Queensland